Bengt Lindskog (25 February 1933 – 27 January 2008) was a Swedish footballer who played at both professional and international levels, as a midfielder.

Career

Club career
Born in Furulund, Lindskog played club football in Sweden and Italy for Helsingborg, Malmö FF, Udinese, Inter Milan, Lecco and IFK Malmö.

International career

Lindskog earned 14 caps for the Swedish national team between 1955 and 1965. Before the 1958 World Cup, which was held on home soil in Sweden, Lindskog transferred from Udinese to Inter; his new contract did not allow him to participate in the tournament. He did, however, participate in qualifying matches for the 1966 World Cup.

References

1933 births
2008 deaths
Swedish footballers
Sweden international footballers
Swedish expatriate footballers
Serie A players
Serie B players
Allsvenskan players
Helsingborgs IF players
Udinese Calcio players
Inter Milan players
Calcio Lecco 1912 players
Malmö FF players
Expatriate footballers in Italy
Swedish expatriate sportspeople in Italy
Association football midfielders